Das Supertalent season 3 is the third season of Germany's Got Talent Franchise. Season 3 began on 16 October 2009. The judges were, as season 2, Dieter Bohlen, Bruce Darnell and Sylvie van der Vaart. Due to the high viewing figures in the season 3, RTL Television increased the number of the audition episodes from 4 to 7 and the number of the semifinalists from 24 to 30. On December 20, 2009, Yvo Antoni went on to win the show, for his act with his dog, which received controversial response.

Semi-finals

* Richard Istel was a replacement for the dancer Dima Shine because Shine got a contract by Cirque du Soleil

Semi-finals summary 
 Buzzed Out

Semi-final 1 (November 28)

Semi-finals 2 (December 5)

Semi-finals 3 (December 12)
Guest Performer: Susan Boyle

Final (December 19)

Sources

Das Supertalent
RTL (German TV channel) original programming